Aarwangen Castle is a castle in the municipality of Aarwangen of the canton of Bern in Switzerland.  It is a Swiss heritage site of national significance.  I

See also
 List of castles in Switzerland

References

External links
 

Cultural property of national significance in the canton of Bern
Castles in the Canton of Bern